Bao Xishun (also known as Xi Shun; born November 2, 1951) is a Chinese-Mongolian herdsman from Chifeng, Inner Mongolia, recognized by Guinness World Records as one of the world's tallest living men at  tall. He was formerly certified as the tallest living man by the Guinness World Records. On September 17, 2009, Sultan Kösen overtook Bao Xishun as the tallest living man.

Career
Xishun Bao claims to have been of normal height until he was sixteen years old. He served in the People's Liberation Army for three years. He later returned to Inner Mongolia to live with his mother and worked at the Chifeng City local hospital for several months. In 2005, he became the world's tallest man. Bao suffers from rheumatism.

In December 2006, Xishun Bao was asked by veterinarians to assist them in removing shards of plastic from the stomachs of two dolphins. The dolphins had accidentally swallowed the shards, which had settled in their stomachs and caused a loss of appetite and depression. Veterinarians had been unable to remove them, so Xishun Bao used his 1.06-metre-long arms to reach into the dolphins' stomachs and remove the plastic manually.

Personal life
Xishun Bao married saleswoman Xia Shujuan on March 24, 2007. The Mongolian ceremony took place on July 12, 2007. Bao's son was born at a hospital in Zunhua, Hebei province on October 2, 2008.
Bao appeared on the eleventh episode of The Amazing Race 16 as the "Pit Stop" greeter. The episode aired on May 2, 2010.

See also
 List of tallest people
 Robert Wadlow, tallest man in history
 Öndör Gongor, a very tall man in early-20th century Mongolia
 Leonid Stadnyk
 Sultan Kösen, current tallest man according to Guinness Book of Records
 Yao Defen
 Gigantism
 Chandra Bahadur Dangi, shortest person in history
 Zeng Jinlian, tallest woman in history

References

External links
World’s tallest man, Xishun Bao, has married
A photo with his bride (picture 4) 
Xishun Bao - World's tallest man

1951 births
Living people
Chinese soldiers
Shepherds
People from Chifeng
Chinese people of Mongolian descent